Marcie Alberts (born April 12, 1975) is an American former professional basketball player and current coach.

Alberts played for Ohio State University during her college athletic career. She had 91.3% of her free-throw attempts in 1996–97, the highest recorded free-throw percentage for an Ohio State senior. In 1997, she played in the WNBA for the Cleveland Rockers.  She was head coach of Orrville High School's girls basketball team before assuming the duties of women's head basketball coach at Heidelberg College. After not being retained following the 2012-2013 basketball season, Alberts was hired in July 2013 to become head girls basketball coach at Mount Vernon High School in Mount Vernon, Ohio. In August 2013, Alberts joined the NCAA Division I Women's Basketball coaching staff as an assistant coach for IPFW.

She will be inducted into the Ohio Basketball Hall of Fame on May 21, 2016 at the 11th Annual Ceremony in Columbus.

References

1975 births
Living people
Basketball coaches from Ohio
Basketball players from Ohio
Cleveland Rockers players
Ohio State Buckeyes women's basketball players
People from Wooster, Ohio
Guards (basketball)